John Edward Kelly may refer to:

John-Edward Kelly (1958–2015), American conductor and saxophonist
John Kelly (New South Wales politician) (John Edward Kelly, 1840–1896)
Nonpareil Dempsey (John Edward Kelly, 1862–1895), Irish-born middleweight boxer

See also
John Kelly (disambiguation)